Eric Kissack is an American film editor, director and producer. Films Kissack has edited include A Very Harold & Kumar 3D Christmas (2011), Horrible Bosses 2 (2014) and Daddy's Home (2015).

Early life and career
Kissack was born and raised in New York City. He attended Hunter College High School and attended Brown University in 1999. He established his profession as a film editor with Role Models, Brüno, Cedar Rapids, The Dictator, Horrible Bosses 2, Daddy's Home and Instant Family. His directorial debut was Love, Sex & Missed Connections.

Filmography

Awards

References

External links
 

American film editors
Living people
1977 births
Brown University alumni